Eslamiyeh (also Romanized as Eslāmīyeh; also known as Soleymānīyeh) is a village in Azadegan Rural District, in the Central District of Rafsanjan County, Kerman Province, Iran. At the 2006 census, its population was 466, in 115 families.

References 

Populated places in Rafsanjan County